Crook's 1862 Expedition was an engagement of the American Civil War in western Virginia (the present state of West Virginia).  Major General George Crook's forces advanced northward to Braxton County's community of Sutton, which had reportedly been occupied and burned by Confederate forces on December 29, 1861. The report turned out to be false.

References

Eastern Theater of the American Civil War
1862 in Virginia
Military operations of the American Civil War in West Virginia
Expeditions of the American Civil War